The Saint Petersburg Stieglitz State Academy of Art and Design (Санкт-Петербургская художественно-промышленная академия имени А. Л. Штиглица; abbreviated as СПГХПА) is the oldest school of design in Russia. It occupies a parcel of land immediately to the east of the Summer Garden in Saint Petersburg.

History 

It was set up in Saint Petersburg in 1876 by Baron Alexander von Stieglitz (1814–84), a millionaire philanthropist, as the School of Technical Drawing. The Stieglitz Museum of Applied Arts was founded in 1878 for the benefit of its students. The school building was designed by Maximilian Messmacher (the school's director, until 1896). By the end of the century, the Central School had branches in Yaroslavl, Saratov, and Narva. 

In 1945, by decision of the Soviet Government School of Technical Drawing, it was re-established as the College of Art and Design which provides training in the monumental, decorative and industrial arts. In 1948 it became the Leningrad Higher School of Art and Industry. It was renamed the Leningrad Vera Mukhina Higher School of Art and Design in 1953 (after Vera Mukhina, the monumentalist author of Worker and Kolkhoz Woman, whose name was a symbol of Soviet art).

As Mukhina was not personally linked to the school, the educational establishment (informally known as Mukha) was renamed after its founder in 1994.

Today 

Today the Academy has 1,500 plus students and 200 professors and teachers and instructors.

The Academy has two faculties: the Faculty of Design, and the Faculty of Monumental and Decorative Art. 

The faculty of Design comprises the following departments: 
 Fashion (Costume) Design
 Industrial Design
 Furniture Design
 Environmental Design
 Graphic Design
 Design of Interior and Equipment
The faculty of Monumental and Decorative Art comprises the following departments: 
 Monumental and Decorative Sculpture
 Monumental and Decorative Painting
 Artistic Textiles
 Painting and Restoration
 Artistic Metal
 Glass and Ceramics
 Theory and History of Art
 Book Binding
In 2016 the Centre for Innovative Education Projects has been established as an integral part of the academy. Its main goal is to teach experts for creative industries.

Alumni
 Victoria Barbă
 Yuri Bosco

References

External links 

 
 History of art Department of Stieglitz Academy 

1876 establishments in the Russian Empire
Culture in Saint Petersburg
Universities and colleges in Saint Petersburg
Art schools in Russia
Cultural heritage monuments of federal significance in Saint Petersburg